Borosenii Noi is a village in Rîșcani District, Moldova.

References

Villages of Rîșcani District